This list of Crocus species shows the accepted species names within the genus Crocus, which are predominantly spring perennial plants in the Iridaceae (iris) family. The list of species is arranged by section. Estimates of the number of species in Crocus have varied widely, from anywhere between 80 to 160, even in the modern era.

Carl Linnaeus originally included two species in 1753, but new species continue to be identified. The deep phylogenetic infrageneric relationships remain unresolved. When subjected to molecular phylogenetic analysis, the sections are well supported but only some of the series. Ongoing, more detailed examination of the various series is leading to a recircumscription, with increasing monophyly. Species segregate to form a basal polytomy of four subclades (A–D). The first clade (A) corresponding to section Crocus, but including C. sieberi and several closely related species (originally included in section Nudiscapus series Reticulati). The remaining three clades (B-D) include all the remaining species of section Nudiscapus. Of these, B and C are small, corresponding to series Orientales and Carpetani respectively, with all remaining series in the large D clade.

Sections, series and species 

Classification of Brian Mathew (1982), amended 2009 and including more recent additions. Series marked with * indicate those known to be monophyletic.

Section Crocus B.Mathew (Clade A) 

Species with a basal prophyll. Type species C. sativus L.

*Series Verni B.Mathew 

 Type species C. vernus (L.) Hill: corms with reticulated fibers, spring-flowering (apart from Crocus longiflorus), flowers for the most part without conspicuous outer striping, bracts absent
 Crocus bertiscensis Raca, Harpke, Shuka & V. Randjel.
 Crocus etruscus Parl.
 Crocus heuffelianus Herb.
 Crocus ilvensis Peruzzi & Carta
 Crocus kosaninii Pulevic
 Crocus longiflorus Raf. – Italian crocus (formerly in Series Longiflori)
 Crocus neapolitanus (Ker Gawl.) Loisel.
 Crocus neglectus Peruzzi and Carta
 Crocus siculus Tineo ex Guss.
 Crocus tommasinianus Herb. – Woodland crocus, Tommasini's crocus
 Crocus vernus (L.) Hill (=C. sativus var. vernus L.; C. vernus sensu stricto ) – Spring crocus, Dutch crocus

*Series Baytopi B.Mathew 

 (new Series) Type species Crocus baytopiorum: corms with strongly reticulated fibers; leaves numerous, narrowly linear; spring-flowering, bracts absent; anthers extrorsely dehiscent
 Crocus baytopiorum Mathew (formerly in Series Verni)

*Series Scardici B.Mathew 

 Type species Crocus scardicus: spring-flowering, leaves have no pale stripe on the upper surface
 Crocus pelistericus Pulevic
 Crocus scardicus Kos.

Series Versicolores B.Mathew 

 Type species Crocus versicolor: : spring-flowering, corms with tunics, which for the most part have parallel fibers, flowers with conspicuous exterior striping
 Crocus cambessedesii J. Gay
 Crocus versicolor Ker Gawl. – cloth-of-silver crocus
 Crocus corsicus Vanucchi ex Maw
 Crocus imperati Ten.
Crocus imperati subsp. imperati
Crocus imperati subsp. suaveolens (Bertol.) B.Mathew
 Crocus minimus DC.

*Series Kotschyani B.Mathew 

 Type species Crocus kotschyanus: : autumn-flowering, anthers white, styles for the most part three-forked
 Crocus autranii Albov.
 Crocus gilanicus B. Matthew (discovered in 1973 and named after Gilan province in Iran where it was first found)
 Crocus karduchorum Kotschy ex Maw
 Crocus kotschyanus K. Koch – Kotschy's crocus (syn. C. zonatus)
Crocus kotschyanus subsp. cappadocicus B.Mathew
Crocus kotschyanus subsp. hakkariensis B.Mathew
Crocus kotschyanus subsp. kotschyanus
Crocus kotschyanus subsp. suworowianus (K.Koch) B.Mathew
 Crocus ochroleucus Boiss. & Gaill.
 Crocus scharojanii Ruprecht
 Crocus scharojanii subsp. scharojanii
 Crocus scharojanii subsp. lazicus (Boiss.) B.Mathew
 Crocus vallicola Herb.

*Series Crocus 

 Type species Crocus sativus: autumn-flowering, anthers yellow, style distinctly three-branched
 Crocus asumaniae B. Mathew & T. Baytop
 Crocus cartwrightianus Herb.
 Crocus sativus L. – saffron crocus (a sterile triploid mutant or hybrid), presumably derived from Crocus cartwrightianus
 Crocus hadriaticus Herb.
 Crocus hadriaticus subsp. hadriaticus
 Crocus hadriaticus subsp. parnassicus (B.Mathew) B.Mathew
 Crocus hadriaticus subsp. parnonicus B.Mathew
 Crocus moabiticus Bornm. & Dinsmore ex Bornm.
 Crocus mathewii H. Kemdorff & E. Pasche (1994)
 Crocus naqabensis Al-Eisawi (2001)
 Crocus oreocreticus B.L. Burtt
 Crocus pallasii Goldb.
Crocus pallasii subsp. dispathaceus (Bowles) B.Mathew
Crocus pallasii subsp. haussknechtii (Boiss. & Reut. ex Maw) B.Mathew
Crocus pallasii subsp. pallasii
Crocus pallasii subsp. turcicus B.Mathew
Crocus thomasii Ten.

Position unclear 

 Following 2009 revision of Mathew 1982.
 Crocus malyi Vis. (formerly in Series Versicolores)
 Crocus banaticus Heuff. (formerly in obsolete Subgenus Crociris)
 Former Series Longiflori B.Mathew Type species C. longiflorus Raf.: autumn-flowering, yellow anthers, styles much divided – now unplaced, and type species moved to series Verni
 Crocus goulimyi Turrill (see also Constantine Goulimis)
 Crocus ligusticus M.G. Mariotti (Syn. Crocus medius Balb.)
 Crocus niveus Bowles
 Crocus nudiflorus Smith.
 Crocus serotinus Salisb. – late crocus
Crocus serotinus subsp. clusii (J.Gay) B.Mathew
Crocus serotinus subsp. salzmannii (J.Gay) B.Mathew
Crocus serotinus subsp. serotinus

Crocus sieberi aggregate

 Crocus cvijicii Kos.
 Crocus dalmaticus Vis.
 Crocus jablanicensis N. Randj. & V. Randj.
 Crocus novicii V.Randjel. & Miljkovic
 Crocus robertianus C.D. Brickell
 Crocus rujanensis Randjel. & D.A. Hill
 Crocus sieberi J.Gay – Sieber's crocus, Cretan crocus
Crocus sieberi subsp. atticus (Boiss. & Orph.) B.Mathew
Crocus sieberi subsp. nivalis (Bory & Chaub.) B.Mathew
Crocus sieberi subsp. sieberi
Crocus sieberi subsp. sublimis (Herb.) B.Mathew
 Crocus veluchensis Herb.

Section Nudiscapus B.Mathew 

Species without a basal prophyll. Type species C. reticulatus Stev. ex Adams

 Crocus lydius Kernd. & Pasche (unplaced)

*Series Orientales B.Mathew (Clade B) 

 Type species Crocus korolkowii: Corm with parallel fibers or lightly reticulated, numerous leaves, spring-flowering, style three-forked
 Crocus alatavicus Semenova & Reg.
 Crocus caspius Fischer & Meyer (formerly in Series Biflori)
 Crocus korolkowii Regel ex Maw – celandine crocus
 Crocus michelsonii B. Fedtsch.

*Series Carpetani B.Mathew (Clade C) 

 Type species Crocus carpetanus: Undersurface of the leaves rounded with grooves, upper surface channeled, spring-flowering, style whitish, obscurely divided
 Crocus carpetanus Boiss. & Reut.
 Crocus nevadensis Amo & Campo

*Series Reticulati B.Mathew (Clade D) 

 Type species Crocus reticulatus: Spring-flowering, a bracteole, trifid styles, and reticulate corm tunics (Series Reticulati s.s. Harpke et al)

Series Reticulati s.s.

 Crocus ancyrensis (Herb.) Maw syn. Crocus reticulatus var. ancyrensis Herb. – Ankara crocus
 Crocus angustifolius Weston – cloth-of-gold crocus
 Crocus danubensis Kerndorff, Pasche, N.Randjelovic & V.Randjelovic
 Crocus filis-maculatis Kerndorff & Pasche
 Crocus micranthus Boiss.
 Crocus orphei Karamplianis & Constantin.
 Crocus reticulatus Steven ex Weber & Mohr
 Crocus variegatus Hoppe & Hornsch.

Former members of Series Reticulati s.l. (unplaced)

 Crocus abantensis T.Baytop & B.Mathew
 Crocus cancellatus Herb.
Crocus cancellatus subsp. cancellatus
Crocus cancellatus subsp. damascenus (Herb.) B.Mathew
Crocus cancellatus subsp. lycius B.Mathew
Crocus cancellatus subsp. mazziaricus (Herb.) B.Mathew
Crocus cancellatus subsp. pamphylicus B.Mathew
 Crocus gargaricus Herb.
 Crocus herbertii B. athew
 Crocus hermoneus Kotschy ex Maw
 Crocus hittiticus T.Baytop & B.Mathew syn. Crocus reticulatus subsp. hittiticus (T.Baytop & B.Mathew) B.Mathew
 Crocus sieheanus Barr ex B.L. Burtt

Series Biflori B.Mathew  (Clade D) 

 Type species Crocus biflorus: Tunics of corms split into rings at the base, either entire or with toothlike projections, leathery in texture, spring- or late-winter flowering, style three-forked
 Crocus adamii Gay syn. Crocus biflorus subsp. adamii (J.Gay) Mathew
 Crocus aerius Herb.
 Crocus albocoronatus (Kernd.) Kernd., Pasche & Harpke syn. C. biflorus subsp. albocoronatus Kerndorff
 Crocus alexandri Nicic ex Velen. syn. Crocus biflorus subsp. alexandri (Nicic ex Velen.) B.Mathew
 Crocus almehensis C.D. Brickell & B. Mathew
 Crocus artvinensis (J.Philippow) Gossheim syn. Crocus biflorus subsp. artvinensis (J.Philippow) B.Mathew
 Crocus bifloriformis Kernd. & Pasche syn. Crocus biflorus subsp. biflorus B.Mathew
 Crocus biflorus Mill. – silvery crocus, Scotch crocus
 Crocus caelestis  (Kernd.) Kernd., Pasche & Harpke syn. Crocus biflorus subsp. caelestis Kernd. & Pasche
 Crocus chrysanthus Herb. – Golden crocus, Snow crocus
 Crocus chrysanthus subsp. chrysanthus
 Crocus chrysanthus subsp. multifolius Papan. & Zacharof
 Crocus crewei Hooker syn. Crocus biflorus subsp. crewei (Hook.f.) B.Mathew
 Crocus cyprius Boiss. & Kotschy
 Crocus danfordiae Maw
 Crocus danfordiae subsp. danfordiae
 Crocus danfordiae subsp. kurdistanicus Maroofi & Assadi
 Crocus fibroannulatus (Kernd.) Kernd., Pasche & Harpke syn. Crocus biflorus subsp. fibroannulatus Kernd. & Pasche
 Crocus hartmannianus Holmboe
 Crocus ionopharynx (Kernd.) Kernd., Pasche & Harpke syn. Crocus biflorus subsp. ionopharynx Kernd. & Pasche
 Crocus kerndorffiorum Pasche (1993)
 Crocus leichtlinii (Dewar) Bowles
 Crocus leucostylosus (Kernd.) Kernd., Pasche & Harpke syn. Crocus biflorus subsp. leucostylosus Kernd. & Pasche
 Crocus melantherus (Kernd.) Kernd., Pasche & Harpke syn. Crocus biflorus subsp. melantherus B.Mathew
 Crocus nerimaniae Yüzbasioglu & Varol (2004)
 Crocus nubigena Herbert syn. Crocus biflorus subsp. nubigena (Herb.) B.Mathew
 Crocus pestalozzae Boiss.
 Crocus pseudonubigena (B.Mathew) Kernd., Pasche & Harpke syn. Crocus biflorus subsp. pseudonubigena B.Mathew
 Crocus pulchricolor Herb. ex Tchichatscheff  syn. Crocus biflorus subsp. pulchricolor (Herb. ex Tchich.) B.Mathew
 Crocus punctatus (Kernd.) Kernd., Pasche & Harpke syn. Crocus biflorus subsp. punctatus B.Mathew
 Crocus stridii Papanicolau & Zacharof syn. Crocus biflorus subsp. stridii (Papan. & Zacharof) B.Mathew
 Crocus tauri Maw  syn. Crocus biflorus subsp. tauri (Maw) B.Mathew
 Crocus wattiorum (B.Mathew) B.Mathew syn. Crocus biflorus subsp. wattiorum B.Mathew
 Crocus weldenii Hoppe & Fuernrohr syn. Crocus biflorus subsp. weldenii (Hoppe & Fuernr.) B.Mathew
 Crocus demirizianus O.Erol & L.Can (2012)
 Crocus yakarianus Yıldırım & O.Erol (2013)
 Crocus yataganensis (Kernd.) Kernd., Pasche & Harpke syn. Crocus biflorus subsp. yataganensis Kernd. & Pasche

*Series Lyciotauri Kerndorff & Pasche (Clade D)(new)
 Type species Crocus lyciotauricus: Outer corm tunics coriaceous or co-riaceous to membranous
 Crocus atrospermus (Kernd. & Pasche) Kernd. & Pasche syn. Crocus biflorus subsp. atrospermus Kernd. & Pasche
 Crocus akdagensis Kerndorff & Pasche
 Crocus akkayaensis Kerndorff & Pasche
 Crocus beydaglarensis Kerndorff & Pasche
 Crocus bowlesianus  Kerndorff & Pasche
 Crocus calanthus  Kerndorff & Pasche
 Crocus katrancensis  Kerndorff & Pasche
 Crocus lyciotauricus Kerndorff & Pasche
 Crocus oreogenus Kerndorff & Pasche
 Crocus salurdagensis Kerndorff & Pasche
 Crocus xanthosus Kerndorff & Pasche
 Crocus ziyaretensis Kerndorff & Pasche

*Series Isauri Kerndorff & Pasche  (Clade D) 
 Type species Crocus isauricus: Outer corm tunics annulate and coriaceous

 Crocus abracteolus
 Crocus antherotes
 Crocus caricus (Kernd.) Kernd., Pasche & Harpke syn. Crocus biflorus subsp. caricus Kernd. & Pasche
 Crocus concinnus Kerndorff & Pasche 
 Crocus fauseri
 Crocus isauricus Kerndorff & Pasche (ex Bowles) syn. Crocus biflorus subsp. isauricus (Siehe ex Bowles) B.Mathew
 Crocus karamanensis
 Crocus mawii
 Crocus mersinensis
 Crocus rechingeri Kerndorff & Pasche 
 Crocus taseliensis
 Crocus tauricus

*Series Speciosi B.Mathew (Clade D) 

 Type species Crocus speciosus: Corm tunic splits into rings at the base, leathery or membranous, foliage after the flowers, autumn-flowering, style much divided
 Crocus pulchellus Herb. – hairy crocus
 Crocus speciosus M. Bieb. – Bieberstein's crocus, large purple crocus
Crocus speciosus subsp. ilgazensis B.Mathew
Crocus speciosus subsp. speciosus
Crocus speciosus subsp. xantholaimos B.Mathew

Series Flavi B.Mathew (Clade D) 

 Type species Crocus flavus: Tunics of the corms membranous, split into parallel fibers, spring-flowering, styles much divided
 Crocus adanensis T. Baytop & B. Mathew (formerly in Series Biflori)
 Crocus antalyensis Mathew
 Crocus antalyensis subsp. antalyensis
 Crocus antalyensis subsp. striatus O.Erol & M.Koçyiğit (2010)
 Crocus antalyensis subsp. gemicii L.Sik & O.Erol (2011)
 Crocus candidus E.D. Clarke
 Crocus flavus Weston – Yellow crocus
 Crocus flavus subsp. flavus
 Crocus flavus subsp. dissectus T.Baytop & B.Mathew
 Crocus flavus subsp. sarichinarensis Rukšans
 Crocus graveolens Boiss. &Reut.
 Crocus hyemalis Boiss.
 Crocus olivieri Gray
 Crocus olivieri subsp. olivieri – Balkan and Turkey
 Crocus olivieri subsp. balansae (J.Gay ex Baker) B. Mathew – endemic round İzmir, West-Turkey
 Crocus olivieri subsp. istanbulensis B. Mathew, Istanbul, Turkey.
 Crocus paschei H. Kerndorff
 Crocus vitellinus Wahl.

*Series Aleppici B.Mathew (Clade D) 

 Type species Crocus aleppicus: Tunics of the corms membranous, with split, parallel fibers, foliage produced at the same time as the flowers, fall- or winter-flowering
 Crocus aleppicus Baker
 Crocus baalbekensis K. Addam & M. Bou Hamdan
 Crocus boulosii Greuter
 Crocus veneris Tappein ex Poech

Series Intertexti  B.Mathew (Clade D) 

 Type species Crocus fleischeri: Corm tunic fibrous with fibers interwoven, spring-flowering
 Crocus fleischeri J.Gay.

*Series Laevigatae B.Mathew (Clade D) 

 Type species Crocus laevigatus Corm tunic membranous or splitting into parallel fibers, sometimes leathery, foliage produced at the same time as flowers, autumn-flowering, anthers white, style much divided
 Crocus boryi J.Gay
 Crocus laevigatus Bory & Chaub.
 Crocus tournefortii J.Gay.

Notes

References

Bibliography 

 , see also Species Plantarum

External links 

Crocus